1996 in professional wrestling describes the year's events in the world of professional wrestling.

List of notable promotions 
These promotions held notable shows in 1996.

Calendar of notable shows

January

February

March

April

May

June

July

August

September

October

November

December

Notable events

Mass Transit Incident
The "Mass Transit incident" was an infamous event in professional wrestling that occurred at an Extreme Championship Wrestling (ECW) house show on November 23, 1996 at the Wonderland Ballroom in Revere, Massachusetts in the United States. It involved Eric Kulas (1979 – May 12, 2002), an aspiring professional wrestler using the ring name "Mass Transit", being bladed too deeply by New Jack of The Gangstas during a tag-team match. Two of Kulas' arteries were severed; he bled profusely and passed out, and needed to be escorted out of the arena with medical attention. Further controversy arose when it came to light that Kulas had lied to ECW owner and booker Paul Heyman about his age and professional wrestling training. The incident led to a future ECW pay-per-view being cancelled (until Heyman negotiated otherwise), a lawsuit from Kulas' family, and went down as one of the most notorious moments of lore in professional wrestling history.

IWRG created
On January 1 – Mexican promoter Adolfo Moreno created the International Wrestling Revolution Group (IWRG) which held its debut show on this date in Arena Naucalpan.

Formation of the nWo
In the main event of World Championship Wrestling (WCW)'s Bash at the Beach pay-per-view on July 7, Scott Hall and Kevin Nash (both of whom had recently defected to WCW from the World Wrestling Federation (WWF) and been presented on-screen as "outsiders") indicated that they would enlist a mystery partner against the team of Randy Savage, Sting, and Lex Luger.

Their partner ended up being Hulk Hogan, who surprisingly attacked long-time Mega Powers partner Savage to conclude the match, thus turning heel for the first time in nearly two decades. In his post-match promo, Hogan indicated his decision to lead the villainous stable which he christened as the New World Order (nWo).

The nWo would be the main focus of WCW programming for the better part of the next three years and led to WCW Monday Nitro defeating WWF Monday Night Raw in the Monday Night Wars ratings battle for eighty-three consecutive weeks. These developments in WCW are often credited with ultimately pushing the WWF toward producing the "edgier" content which would become the hallmark of the Attitude Era.

Accomplishments and tournaments

WCW

WWF

WWF Hall of Fame

Slammy Awards

Awards and honors

Pro Wrestling Illustrated

Wrestling Observer Newsletter

Wrestling Observer Newsletter Hall of Fame

Wrestling Observer Newsletter awards

Title changes

ECW

FMW

IWRG

NJPW

WCW

WWF

Debuts

 Uncertain debut date
 Mari Apache
 March 10 – The Rock
 May 2 – Sachie Abe
 July 28 – Miho Wakizawa
 August 12 – Sakura Hirota
 September 15 – Takashi Sasaki

Births
 February 22 - Rabbit Miu 
 March 20 – Blair Davenport 
 June 2 – Jacy Jayne
 July 30 – Marko Stunt 
 October 11 – Rhea Ripley

Retirements
 Akio Sato (1970–1996)
 Billy Jack Haynes (1982–1996)
 Damian Kane (1980–1996)
 Tom Zenk (1986–October 1996)
 Tyler Mane (1986–1996)
 Dick Slater (1972–October 1996)
 Dynamite Kid (December 24, 1975 – October 10, 1996)
 Espanto Jr. (1971–January 1996)
 Jerry Stubbs (1970–1996, return to wrestle for a match in 2019)
 Mr. Fuji (1965–1996) 
 Steve Regal (1977–1996)
 Wahoo McDaniel (1961–July 1996)
 Rocky Iaukea (1981–1996)
 Tom Lister, Jr. (1989–March 1996)
 Tiger Conway Jr. (1971-1996)

Deaths
 May 3 – Ray Stevens, 60
 June 15 – Dick Murdoch, 49
 June 26 - Octavio Gaona, 94
 July 20 - The Missouri Mauler, 65
 July 23 – Herb Abrams, 41
 August 23 - Neil Superior, 33
 August 30 - Chris Colt, 50 
 September 11 – Sapphire, 61

See also
List of WCW pay-per-view events
List of WWE pay-per-view events
List of FMW supercards and pay-per-view events
List of ECW supercards and pay-per-view events

References

 
professional wrestling